

P02B Antitrematodals

P02BA Quinoline derivatives and related substances
P02BA01 Praziquantel
P02BA02 Oxamniquine

P02BB Organophosphorous compounds
P02BB01 Metrifonate

P02BX Other antitrematodal agents
P02BX01 Bithionol
P02BX02 Niridazole
P02BX03 Stibophen
P02BX04 Triclabendazole

P02C Antinematodal agents

P02CA Benzimidazole derivatives
P02CA01 Mebendazole
P02CA02 Tiabendazole
P02CA03 Albendazole
P02CA04 Ciclobendazole
P02CA05 Flubendazole
P02CA06 Fenbendazole
P02CA51 Mebendazole, combinations

P02CB Piperazine and derivatives
P02CB01 Piperazine
P02CB02 Diethylcarbamazine

P02CC Tetrahydropyrimidine derivatives
P02CC01 Pyrantel
P02CC02 Oxantel

P02CE Imidazothiazole derivatives
P02CE01 Levamisole

P02CF Avermectines
P02CF01 Ivermectin

P02CX Other antinematodals
P02CX01 Pyrvinium
P02CX02 Bephenium
P02CX03 Moxidectin

P02D Anticestodals

P02DA Salicylic acid derivatives
P02DA01 Niclosamide

P02DX Other anticestodals
P02DX01 Desaspidin
P02DX02 Dichlorophen

References

P02